Marquard & Bahls is a Hamburg-based company that is active in the fields of energy and chemicals. Its core lines of business include tank storage logistics, trading and aviation fuelling. Marquard & Bahls was founded in 1947 and has been a stock corporation under commercial law since 1992. The Group has a presence in 33 countries around the world. At the end of 2019, the company employed 6,715 people (2018: 7,561). In 2019, the company generated revenue of EUR 13.875 billion (2018: EUR 14.728 billion).

Business Areas 

Marquard & Bahls is organized as a holding company  and operates through its subsidiaries in several business areas:

 Mabanaft is the trading division of Marquard & Bahls. Its business includes regional trading and wholesaling of petroleum products. The company also operates in the bunkering, service-station and heating oil retail businesses, as well as trading in liquid gas and biofuels. Its annual volume of sales is approximately 18.1 million tons (as at: December 2020).
 Oiltanking is one of the largest independent tank storage providers for petroleum products, chemicals and gases worldwide. The company owns and operates 64 terminals in 24 countries with a total capacity of 20 million cubic meters (as at: December 2020). The total throughput of all tank terminals in 2019 was about 155 million tons.
 Skytanking provides a full range of aviation fuelling services. The company services around 2 million aircraft a year, with annual throughput exceeding 24.7 million cubic metres of jet fuel (as at: February 2020). Besides into-plane fuelling, its range of services also covers the operation of aviation fuel storage and hydrant systems, as well as the planning, financing and construction of these facilities. Its customers include airlines, airports, and oil companies. Skytanking is represented at 83 airports in 14 countries in Europe, Asia, Africa, North America and Australia (as at: December 2020).

Management and Governance 
Since August 2018, Mark Garrett has served as CEO of the company, which is not listed on the stock exchange. Hellmuth Weisser was Chairman of the supervisory board from 2003 to February 2017. His successor is Daniel Weisser.

History 
Theodor Weisser established the business in 1947 by purchasing Marquard & Bahls, a company that had traded in cereals and lubricants since its founding in 1913. At the time of the takeover, the company existed only as a shell. Theodor Weisser began trading in heating oil and lubricants, and gradually expanded the business activities in the following years. In the mid-1950s, the company also entered the tank storage business, and in the 1960s focused particularly on expanding its activities abroad. Its trading subsidiary Mabanaft played an important role in developing the spot market in Rotterdam.

In 1972, the tank terminals owned by Marquard & Bahls were grouped into its Oiltanking subsidiary; this marked the beginning of the establishment of an independent provider of tank storage services. In the 1990s, a new service-station organization was established, which now does business under the OIL! brand. Beyond this, the company had been active in the sale of heating oil to end-consumers since the 1980s; these activities were bundled under the Petronord umbrella in 1996. In 1999, Marquard & Bahls entered the aviation fuelling business, and continually expanded this line of business, which operates as Skytanking, in the following years. Since 2002, Marquard & Bahls has also been active in the field of renewable energies. In addition to the biofuels trade, which is part of Mabanaft, this also includes biogas. The Mabagas subsidiary realized biogas projects based on organic waste from 2008 to 2018.

In 2008 and 2011, Marquard & Bahls acquired shares in Newsco companies through Oiltanking. In 2014, Marquard & Bahls achieved a majority shareholding in Newsco by acquiring further stakes. In March 2017, the Group sold all of its shares in Newsco International Energy Services. In May 2012, Oiltanking acquired United Bulk Terminals in the US. This division had been directly allocated to Marquard & Bahls since the end of 2014 until September 2019, when Marquard & Bahls sold United Bulk Terminals. In August 2019, Marquard & Bahls also sold its stake in natGAS AG, Potsdam, to the former co-shareholder Friedrich Scharr KG, Stuttgart. Exploring investment opportunities in the renewable energy & chemical sector, Marquard & Bahls invested in the Norwegian company Nordic Blue Crude in December 2019.

References

External links 

Official website

Oil companies of Germany
Companies based in Hamburg
1947 establishments in Germany